The Auditorium of Universidad Complutense (Spanish: Paraninfo de la Universidad Complutense) is a building located in Madrid, Spain. It was declared Bien de Interés Cultural in 1980.

References 

Buildings and structures in Universidad neighborhood, Madrid
Bien de Interés Cultural landmarks in Madrid